Rio Bananal Futebol Clube, commonly known as Rio Bananal, is a Brazilian football club based in Rio Bananal, Espírito Santo state.

History
The club was founded on January 17, 2007. They finished in the second position in the Campeonato Capixaba Second Level in 2008, losing the competition to Serra.

Stadium
Rio Bananal Futebol Clube play their home games at Estádio Virgílio Grassi. The stadium has a maximum capacity of 4,000 people.

References

Association football clubs established in 2007
Football clubs in Espírito Santo
2007 establishments in Brazil